Eric Charles Matti (born December 21, 1970), professionally known as Erik Matti, is a Filipino filmmaker. He is known for directing On the Job (2013), Honor Thy Father (2015), Seklusyon (2016),  BuyBust (2018), and On the Job: The Missing 8 (2021).  

Matti co-founded the production company Reality Entertainment with Dondon Monteverde, son of film producer Lily Monteverde. Matti and Monteverde also co-founded the streaming service Upstream.

Early life and education
Matti hails from Bacolod. He is the sixth (and youngest) children of Enrique, an atheist and custom's agent, and Julieta, a government employee raised in a family "considered to be gangsters". Of his deceased father, Matti reminisced that he was "an intellectual and never really saw work as something to devote himself into. He was a dreamer and a debater."

Matti graduated from elementary and high school at Colegio San Agustin-Bacolod. He studied college at the University of St. La Salle initially as a biology major but eventually shifted his focus to mass communication. Despite his six years in college, he did not graduate.

Career

Erik Matti's career in the film industry began when he was hired to supervise the script continuity for the 1994 superhero film Mars Ravelo's Darna! Ang Pagbabalik.

Personal life
Matti is married to screenwriter Michiko Yamamoto. Politically he is an outspoken critic of Rodrigo Duterte, in part due to the Filipino president's proclamation of martial law during the Marawi crisis. As such, Matti sparked criticism for cursing at Duterte's supporters in social media.

Filmography

Film

Television

Awards

References

External links
 

1970 births
Living people
Filipino film directors
Filipino screenwriters
Filipino film producers
People from Bacolod